Milan or Milán is a surname of Indian, Spanish and Italian origin. Notable people with the surname include:

 Blair Milan (1981–2011), Australian actor and television presenter, son of Lyndey Milan
 Clyde Milan (1887–1953), American baseball player
 Eduardo Milán, Uruguayan poet and critic
 Gabriel Milan (c. 1631–1689), governor of the Danish West Indies (later US Virgin Islands)
 Lyndey Milan, Australian media personality
 Milton Milan, American politician convicted for corruption
 Susan Milan, British classical flautist

See also
 Millan or Millán

Surnames of Indian origin
Spanish-language surnames
Italian-language surnames